Hunter and Cook was a Toronto-based art and culture magazine. It was founded in 2008, and published three times a year until 2011, for 10 issues total. Visual artists Tony Romano and Jay Isaac were the publishers. The magazine included in-depth articles and interviews with contemporary artists, as well as curated projects made specifically for the magazine by invited artists. The magazine was featured in Eye Weekly, and The Coast.

References

Visual arts magazines published in Canada
Cultural magazines
Defunct magazines published in Canada
Magazines established in 2008
Magazines disestablished in 2011
Magazines published in Toronto
Triannual magazines published in Canada
2008 establishments in Ontario
2011 disestablishments in Ontario